Bruja is an original novel based on the U.S. television series Angel.

Plot summary
L.A. is shocked when a woman attacks a priest. The woman had just confessed to the priest that she had murdered her own son. Meanwhile, Angel and Co. get reports of a woman fighting with teens across L.A. The woman appears to be everywhere, a 'bruja' - a witch. She may be an embodiment of "La Llorona," known in Spanish lore as the "Weeping Woman."

The priest soon goes into a coma, but Angel Investigations is busy with other matters: Doyle has a vision of a young mother and her son in danger at the docks. Meanwhile, Cordelia's looking for a big-shot producer's missing wife. Angel must find the connections between the missing wife and recent events.

Continuity

Supposed to be set early in Angel season 1, before the episode "Hero".
Characters include Angel, Cordelia Chase, Allen Francis Doyle.

Canonical issues

Angel books such as this one are not usually considered by fans as canonical. Some fans consider them stories from the imaginations of authors and artists, while other fans consider them as taking place in an alternative fictional reality. However unlike fan fiction, overviews summarising their story, written early in the writing process, were 'approved' by both Fox and Joss Whedon (or his office), and the books were therefore later published as officially Buffy/Angel merchandise.

External links

Reviews
Litefoot1969.bravepages.com - Review of this book by Litefoot

Angel (1999 TV series) novels
2001 American novels
2001 fantasy novels
Novels by Mel Odom